George Watson (February 26, 1890 – June 28, 1938) was a Canadian cyclist. He competed in the individual time trial at the 1912 Summer Olympics.

References

External links
 

1890 births
1938 deaths
Canadian male cyclists
Olympic cyclists of Canada
Cyclists at the 1912 Summer Olympics
Cyclists from British Columbia